The 1979 Pittsburgh Steelers season was the franchise's 47th season in the National Football League (NFL). The Steelers successfully defended their Super Bowl Championship from the previous year, despite not improving on their 14-2 record from last year with a 12–4 record. They went on to defeat the Los Angeles Rams in Super Bowl XIV. The Steelers started out to a 4-0 record.  Adding to the previous season, the Steelers had won 12 in a row.  They finished the regular season at 12-4.  In six of those games the opponents were held to a touchdown or less.  In the playoffs Pittsburgh defeated Miami, 34-14 and then for the second consecutive season beat Houston 27-13, in the AFC championship game. The Steelers ended the decade by defeating the Los Angeles Rams 31-19 in Super Bowl XIV. Despite them and the San Diego Chargers having 12-4 records, the Chargers were awarded the top seed in the AFC because of their victory over the Steelers.

With the win, and the Pittsburgh Pirates win in the 1979 World Series, Pittsburgh would be the last city to claim Super Bowl and World Series wins in the same year until 1986 when the New York Mets won the World Series in 7 games over the Boston Red Sox, and the New York Giants won Super Bowl XXI 39–20 over the Denver Broncos.

On February 23, 2007, NFL Network aired America's Game: The Super Bowl Champions, the 1979 Pittsburgh Steelers, with team commentary from John Banaszak, L.C. Greenwood and John Stallworth, and narrated by Ed Harris. They are the last team to win a Super Bowl featuring players that had never played for another team; 40 original draft picks and six free agents out of college. The records for most points scored per game as well as in the regular season overall for the Steelers belonged to the 1979 squad, until they scored 436, amounting to 27.3 per game in 2014, the all-time franchise record in both categories.

Offseason

NFL draft

Personnel

Staff

Roster

Preseason

Schedule

Notes:

 All times are EASTERN time.

Regular season

Schedule

Note: Intra-division opponents are in bold text.

Notes:

 All times are EASTERN time. (UTC–4 and UTC–5 starting October 28)

Game summaries

Week 1: at New England Patriots

Week 2: vs. Houston Oilers

Week 3: at St. Louis Cardinals

Week 4: vs. Baltimore Colts

Week 5: at Philadelphia Eagles

Week 6: at Cleveland Browns

Week 7: at Cincinnati Bengals

Week 8: vs. Denver Broncos

Week 9: vs. Dallas Cowboys

Week 10: vs. Washington Redskins

In that game. Franco Harris became the 5th man to rush for 8,000 career rushing yards, and it was also Chuck Noll's 95th win as a head coach, the same number that Vince Lombardi won during his career.

Week 11: at Kansas City Chiefs

Week 12: at San Diego Chargers

Week 13: vs. Cleveland Browns

Week 14: vs. Cincinnati Bengals

Week 15: at Houston Oilers

Week 16: vs. Buffalo Bills

Standings

Stats

Passing

Rushing

Receiving

Kicking

Punting

Kick Return

Punt Return

Defense & Fumbles

Scoring Summary

Team

Quarter-by-quarter

Postseason

Schedule

Notes:

 All times are EASTERN time.

Game summaries

AFC Divisional Playoff: vs. Miami Dolphins

AFC Championship: vs. Houston Oilers

Super Bowl XIV: vs. Los Angeles Rams

Statistics

Passing

Rushing

Receiving

Honors and awards

 Terry Bradshaw, Super Bowl MVP

References

External links
 1979 Pittsburgh Steelers season at Profootballreference.com 
 1979 Pittsburgh Steelers season statistics at jt-sw.com 
 

Pittsburgh Steelers seasons
American Football Conference championship seasons
Super Bowl champion seasons
Pittsburgh Steelers
AFC Central championship seasons
Pittsburgh Steel